Nickel Plate Road 779 is a 2-8-4 or "Berkshire" type steam locomotive built for the New York, Chicago and St. Louis Railroad, (reporting mark NKP) completed on May 13th 1949, for use on fast freight trains. It was the last new steam locomotive to be delivered to the Nickel Plate Road, and alongside L&N 1991, another 2-8-4 for the Louisville and Nashville, is the last of 36 steam engines completed by Lima-Hamilton from 1947-1949, and the final 2-8-4 locomotive on standard gauge completed in the world. L-H's first diesel, A-3080 demonstrator #1000 was completed the same day as #779. NKP also received the first production A-3080, NKP #305, one of 4 delivered by Lima-Hamilton in 1949. 

Upon her retirement in early 1958, the locomotive had logged 677,095 miles.

In 1966, she was donated to the City of Lima, Ohio and placed on display in Lincoln Park, where she remains to date.

References

External links
Nickel Plate Roster 

Lima Locomotive Works: The Last Locomotive to Be Built
Southern Steam Trains: NKP 779

779
2-8-4 locomotives
Lima locomotives
Individual locomotives of the United States
Lima, Ohio
Tourist attractions in Allen County, Ohio
Standard gauge locomotives of the United States
Preserved steam locomotives of Ohio